Toshiya Watanabe is a former taijiquan athlete from Japan who was a world champion.

Career 
Watanabe's international debut was at the 1995 World Wushu Championships where he won a silver medal in taijiquan and won a bronze medal two years later at the 1997 World Wushu Championships. The same year, he won a silver medal at the 1997 East Asian Games. He then achieved another silver medal victory in men's taijiquan at the 1998 Asian Games. The following year, he won a bronze medal at the 1999 World Wushu Championships. In 2001, he achieved a bronze medal at the 2001 East Asian Games and was a double silver medalist at the 2001 World Wushu Championships. His last competition was at the 2003 World Wushu Championships where he became world champion in taijijian.

See also 

 List of Asian Games medalists in wushu

References 

Living people
Japanese wushu practitioners
Wushu practitioners at the 1998 Asian Games
Wushu practitioners at the 2002 Asian Games
Medalists at the 1998 Asian Games
Asian Games medalists in wushu
Asian Games silver medalists for Japan
Year of birth missing (living people)